Khakestar, also called Rībāt-i-Khākistar, is a historical settlement and caravanserai in Khorasan in the mountains that now separate Iran from Turkmenistan.
 Formerly a customs post on the border between Qajar Iran and Imperial Russia, it is located on the banks of the Lain stream, which flows down from here to Kaakhka in Turkmenistan. It is surrounded by hills with a large sugar loaf-shaped mountain on one side, and it has a spring.

The 11th-century Seljuk emir Savtegin was born at Khakestar, and he later built a ribat (i.e. caravanserai) here.

In the late 1800s, Mirza Reza Khan Arfa od-Dowleh visited the village of Khakestar after hearing a story about its inhabitants' longevity. He wrote that it was close enough to Quchan that someone could leave Quchan in the morning, eat lunch in Khakestar, and be back in Quchan by the evening. Its buildings were made of mud, with roofs variously made from wood or reeds. There were 80 families and many of the villagers were old; there was basically zero surplus food production so when young people grew up and got married they would emigrate from the village. In years where the harvest was good, their diet consisted of wheat bread and dairy products - milk, cheese, and yogurt. When the wheat harvest was poor, they would eat barley bread. Their main subsistence was from keeping livestock and selling the wool in the markets at Quchan or Shirvan; they had no fruit gardens and bought fruit, clothes, and dishes at the markets.

In 1918, the British agent Reginald Teague-Jones stopped at Khakestar on his way from Mashhad into Russian territory; at that time, Khakestar was a quarantine post for travellers coming into Iran from Russia, where there was an outbreak of cholera at the time.

References 

Populated places in Razavi Khorasan Province
Caravanserais